Bagnot is a commune in the Côte-d'Or department in the Bourgogne-Franche-Comté region of eastern France.

The inhabitants of the commune are known as Bagnotins or Bagnotines.

Geography
Bagnot is located some 30 km south of Dijon and 15 km east by north-east of Beaune. Access to the commune is by the D20 from Argilly in the west which passes through the village and continues east to Auvillars-sur-Saône. The D35E goes south from the village to the D973. The A36 autoroute passes through the south of the commune from west to east but has no exit in the commune. The nearest exit is Exit  some 5 km east of the commune. The commune is extensively forested in the south with forests also in the north-west; the centre of the commune is farmland.

The Sereine river flows through the commune and the village from the north-east and continues south-west to join the Meuzin near Palleau. Two tributaries feed the Sereine from the commune - one fed by the Étang de Menans just west of the commune and the other from the Grand Étang west of the village. Another stream rises in the east of the commune and flows east through the Étang Limonet and Étang du Moulin, both just east of the commune, to the Saône river at Glanon.

Neighbouring communes and villages

Administration

List of Successive Mayors

Demography
In 2017 the commune had 161 inhabitants.

Culture and heritage

Civil heritage
The commune has a number of buildings and structures that are registered as historical monuments:
A Farmhouse at CVO 2 Meix Martin (18th century)
A Farmhouse at D20 (1842)
A Town Hall/School at D20 (19th century)
A Farmhouse at Les Granges de Bagnot (18th century) The Farmhouse contains a Statue of the Sacred Heart (19th century) which is registered as an historical object.
Houses and Farms (18th-19th century)

Religious heritage
The commune has several religious buildings and sites that are registered as historical monuments:
A Cemetery Cross at D20 (19th century)
A Presbytery at D20 (19th century)
The Church of the Nativity (12th century). The Church is a Romanesque building novel originally from the 12th and 13th centuries and later redesigned. It is decorated with murals from the 15th century (they are dated 1484) on the theme of the Last Judgment which were discovered in 1862. In particular there are the Diables de Bagnot (The Devils of Bagnot) that made this church famous. The walls and the choir vaults depict scenes from sacred history: The Annunciation, Saints, Evangelists, and donors. The arch in the choir is decorated with a calendar representing the twelve months of the year with scenes of daily life. The Church contains a large number of items that are registered as historical objects.

See also
Communes of the Côte-d'Or department

References

External links
Bagnot on the old National Geographic Institute website 
Bagnot on Géoportail, National Geographic Institute (IGN) website 
Bagnot on the 1750 Cassini Map

Communes of Côte-d'Or